Gravataí (Tupi–Guarani: gravatá, a kind of flower common in the region; y, river.) is a Brazilian municipality near Porto Alegre at the Rio Grande do Sul State. Its population is approximately 280,000 people, making it the sixth most populous city in the state.

History
The land where Gravataí is located was subject of dispute between Portugal and Spain until 1750, when they signed the Treaty of Madrid. Originally known as Aldeia de Nossa Senhora dos Anjos, Gravataí was founded on April 8, 1763 by settlers designated by the Portuguese to consolidate the crown presence in the region, led by Pedro Gonçalves Sandoval and João Lourenço Veloso. 
In 1772, the São Pedro province governor José Marcelino de Figueiredo started to develop the town. He built schools, mills and pottery facilities.

Then known as Aldeia dos Anjos, in 1806 the town was declared a district of Porto Alegre. By 1880 Gravataí was chartered as a borough ("Vila" in Portuguese). On March 2, 1938, the Executive order #311 declared Gravataí a city.

Geography
According to the Brazilian Institute of Geography and Statistics, the city has a total area of 463.5 km² (192.2 square miles) divided into five separate districts (boroughs): Gravataí, Barro Vermelho, Ipiranga, Itacolomi and Morungava. The main supply of drinking water is provided by the Gravataí River, formed at Banhado Grande and flowing west into the city towards the Guaíba estuary.

Climate

The climate in Gravataí is humid subtropical (Cfa). Summers are warm and the hottest month is February, with an average temperature of 25 °C (77 °F). Winters are cold (by Brazilian standards) and the coldest month is July, with an average temperature of 14 °C (57 °F). The wettest months are August and September, with 140 mm (5.51 in) of precipitation, with rain regularly falling all year long.

Neighbor cities
 North: Novo Hamburgo and Taquara
 South: Alvorada and Viamão
 East: Glorinha
 West: Cachoeirinha and Sapucaia do Sul

Economy

Agriculture was essential to Gravataí's economy during its first two centuries. After the 1950s the city started a process of industrialization. This process was accelerated in 2000 after the inauguration of a General Motors manufacturing plant. Since its opening 600,000 cars have been built, more than one hundred thousand Chevrolet Celta (also known as Suzuki Fun) and Chevrolet Prisma per year.

Today, manufacturing is the major economic driver and Gravataí has been classified as a blue collar city.

Government
The city elects a mayor, who serves a maximum of two four-year terms; Marco Alba is the current mayor.

The city council ("Câmara de Vereadores" in Portuguese) is composed of 21 aldermen elected to office for four years. The council functions as a parliamentary or congressional style legislative body, proposing bills, holding votes (especially the municipal budget), and passing laws to help govern the city.

Demographics

As of the 2010 Census, Gravataí had a population of 255,660, with 92,425 households, and 82,442 families residing in the city. The population density was 551.8 people per km² (1,429.16/sq mi). There were 92,425 housing units at an average density of 199.4/km² (480.86/sq mi). The ethnic/racial makeup of the city was 84.7% White, 8% Brown, 7% Black, 0.2% Asian, and 0.2% Amerindian.

The per capita income for the city was R$18,642 (US$10,965) in 2007.

Religion

Source: IBGE 2010.

Education
Gravataí has three colleges and universities offering bachelor's and professional or master's degree programs: Universidade Luterana do Brasil, FACENSA, and Faculdade QI.
 Preschool: 69
 Elementary and Middle school: 100
 High school: 23

Transportation
By land, Gravataí is practically midway between São Paulo and Buenos Aires, the two main economic centers of Mercosur. The interstate highway BR-290 passes through the city and connects to BR-101 highway.

Interstates and major highways
BR-290 – Runs east-west just south of the city and is accessible from Gravataí via exit 74 (RS-118) and exit 68 (General Motors plant); provides access to Porto Alegre (westbound) and to the coastline (eastbound).
RS-020 – Connects the town to Taquara and the Serra Gaúcha (the Gaucho Highlands).
RS-030 – Runs through the city parallel to BR-290 and connecting Gravataí to Santo Antônio da Patrulha and Osório, ending in Tramadaí City (in the Atlantic Coast).
RS-118 – Is a very important metropolitan perimeter highway connecting Gravataí to Esteio (northbound) and to Viamão (southbound), crossing by the Alvorada, Cachoeirinha and the Sapucaia do Sul Cities.

Airport
The closest airport to the city is the Salgado Filho International Airport, located off BR-290 highway, 14 miles west of Gravataí.

Public transportation
Public transit throughout the region is provided by SOGIL, Unesul, VICASA, and TransCal.

Waterways
Though it is not used for transporting goods and materials, the Gravataí River is a navigable waterway for boating.

References

External links
Gravataí Mayor's Office (in Portuguese)
Sogil: Gravataí's Intercity bus system and schedule (in Portuguese)

Municipalities in Rio Grande do Sul